Alavi in Iran may refer to:
 Allahlu, Varzaqan, a village in East Azerbaijan Province, Iran
 Alaviq, Varzaqan, a village in East Azerbaijan Province, Iran
 Alavi, Hamadan, a village in Hamadan Province, Iran
 Alavi, Isfahan, a village in Isfahan Province, Iran
 Alavi, Khuzestan, a village in Khuzestan Province, Iran
 Alavi, an alternate name of Alavicheh, a city in Isfahan Province, Iran